The Bristol Channel Cutter, also called the Bristol Channel Cutter 28, is an American sailboat that was designed by Lyle Hess as a "character boat" cruiser and first built in 1976.

The boat is based upon Hess's earlier Renegade design.

Production
The design was built by Sam L. Morse Co. of Costa Mesa, California, United States, who completed 128 boats between 1976 and 2007. In 2011 one boat was built by Cape George Marine Works in Port Townsend, Washington. Between 30 and 45 boats were also built in Vancouver, British Columbia, Canada, by two companies. The hulls were built by Steveston Fiberglass and the finish work performed by G & B Woodworks.

There are reports of royalties not being paid to Lyle Hess and Sam L. Morse for the construction of the Canadian hulls.

The rumor is a result of confusion over Hull Identification Numbers (HIN). At the time the Canadian Bristol Channel Cutter hulls were built, Canada did not require HINs and this resulted in a number of Bristol Channel Cutters without HINs. This lack of accountability for the hulls led to disagreements with Sam L. Morse, which amongst other reasons, led to them rescinding their license to Steveston Fiberglass and Canadian production was then stopped.

The company often mentioned in these rumors, Channel Cutter Yachts, has never produced a Bristol Channel Cutter, but the owner, Bryan Gittins, is the G from G & B Woodworks who originally finished the Canadian hulls. G & B Woodworks dissolved with the ending of Bristol Channel Cutter production. Sometime after this Gittens purchased the rights to Lyle Hess's Falmouth 34 design and setup shop as Channel Cutter Yachts in order to produce this new design.

Design
The Bristol Channel Cutter is a recreational keelboat, built predominantly of fiberglass, with wood trim. It has a cutter rig, a spooned plumb stem, an angled transom, a keel and transom-hung rudder controlled by a tiller and a fixed long keel. It displaces  and carries  of lead ballast.

The fuel tank holds .

The design has sleeping accommodation for four people, with two straight settee berths and a pilot berth in the main cabin and an aft quarter berth on the starboard side. The galley is located on the port side at the companionway ladder. The galley is "L"-shaped and is equipped with a stove and a sink. A navigation station is opposite the galley, on the starboard side. The head is located in the bow and includes an optional shower.

Operational history
A Blue Water Boats review noted that the design, "represents a pinnacle of ruggedness and practicality while retaining respectable performance. Few boats can take the abuse of extended voyaging as well as the Bristol Channel Cutter and I guess it's become something of a Lyle Hess masterpiece."

See also
List of sailing boat types

Related development
Falmouth Cutter 22
Falmouth Cutter 26
Falmouth Cutter 34

Similar sailboats
Aloha 28
Beneteau First 285
Cal 28
Catalina 28
Grampian 28
J/28
Laser 28
O'Day 28
Pearson 28
Sabre 28
Sirius 28
Tanzer 28
TES 28 Magnam
Viking 28
Westsail 32

References

Keelboats
1970s sailboat type designs
Sailing yachts
Sailboat type designs by Lyle Hess
Sailboat types built in the United States
Sailboat types built in Canada
Sailboat types built by Sam L. Morse Co.
Sailboat types built by Cape George Marine Works
Sailboat types built by Channel Cutter Yachts